Shukugawara Station is the name of two train stations in Japan:

Shukugawara Station (Aomori) (宿川原駅)
Shukugawara Station (Kanagawa) (宿河原駅)